David Copperfield is a 1913 British black-and-white silent film based on the 1850 novel David Copperfield by Charles Dickens. It is the second-oldest known film adaptation of the novel. Running six reels, it is significant as a very early British feature film at a moment when the world film industry was beginning its move away from traditional short films towards longer and more ambitious works.

The film was made by the Hepworth Manufacturing Corporation, was produced by Cecil Hepworth and was written and directed by Thomas Bentley. In the United Kingdom it was released in August 1913, and in the United States it was released on 1 December 1913. It ran at 67 minutes on seven reels.

A review of the film in The Dickensian said:
"It occupies close upon two hours to exhibit and is divided into six parts, telling the story of David's life from Blunderstone to his happy union with Agnes. Obviously the part of David is enacted by three different actors, Master Eric Desmond, Mr Len Bethel and Mr Kenneth Ware. The first-named being one of the cleverest child actors we have seen. We have no space to speak of all the characters presented. Each and all of them were Dickens' creations to the life and not mere exaggerations as is often the case.

The film not only includes all of the most prominent characters and all the necessary incidents of the book to make the story intelligible to the lay reader, but they have been enacted in the actual places in which the novelist laid them."

Plot summary

Cast
 Reginald Sheffield as Eric Desmond as David Copperfield as a boy
 Len Bethel as David Copperfield as a youth
 Kenneth Ware as David Copperfield as a Man
 Edna May as Em'ly as a Child
 Amy Verity as Em'ly as a Woman
 Alma Taylor as Dora Spenlow
 H. Collins as Wilkins Micawber
 Miss West as Emma Micawber
 Jack Hulcup as Uriah Heep
 Jamie Darling as Daniel Peggotty
 Cecil Mannering as James Steerforth

References

External links
 
 
 

1913 films
Films based on David Copperfield
British black-and-white films
1910s historical drama films
British silent feature films
British historical drama films
Films set in the 19th century
Films set in England
Films set in London
Films directed by Thomas Bentley
Hepworth Pictures films
1913 drama films
1910s English-language films
1910s British films
Silent drama films